Kokin Gumi are an oriental musical collaboration.  Using a combination of Western and Eastern styles, the band create music designed to stimulate the mind. The name derives from "Ko", meaning traditional, "kin", meaning contemporary and "Gumi", meaning group.

All of the music was written by Masakazu Yoshizawa.  The group was made up of him, Tateo Takahashi, Hirome Hashibe, Daniel May and Jimmy Brandmeier. However, in 2007, Yoshizawa died aged 57 of stomach cancer.

References

External links

Japanese instrumental musical groups